Michaël Llodra was the defending champion.
David Goffin defeated Ruben Bemelmans 6–4, 3–6, 6–3 in the final to win the title.

Seeds

Draw

Finals

Top half

Bottom half

References
 Main draw
 Qualifying draw

Singles